Collectors, Shooters and Hunters (in Portuguese: "Colecionadores, Atiradores desportivos e Caçadores" - CACs), in Brazilian law, is the designation given to those citizens, who, fulfilling the imposed demands, in relation to criminal records and handling and firing proficiency, have the right to possession of firearms and ammunitions for exercise the collecting, shooting and hunting activities, being able to exercise one, two or all of them.

According to data collected from the Army and the Federal Police, in January 2021, there were more than 1 million registered CACs in Brazil.

CAC in practice
According to Ordinance No. 51 (2015) of the Army Logistic Command, in its article 3, "The Registration Certificate (known as "CR") is the supporting document of the administrative act that effectively registers the individual or legal entity in Army to authorize the exercise of activities with PCEs (Products Controlled by the Army)".

The "CR" (Registration Certificate - "Certificado de Registro" in Portuguese) is the document issued by the Army, through SFPC - "Inspection Service for Controlled Products", precisely to prove that the citizen is authorized to perform the  Collectors, Shooters and Hunters activity.

The "CR" is governed by the "SIGMA", "Military Weapons Management System". The entire management of registered shooters is carried out by a Military Region ("RM" - "Região Militar" in Portuguese) where the individual or legal entity is domiciled.

One of the requirements for the "CR" Concession is that the shooter must maintain a link with a Shooting or Hunting Club, that is, be regularly up to date with his financial obligations; prove and participate effectively in shooting practice, courses, training and/or competitions.

For the authorization of the "CR", several criteria are required, such as: personal identification, suitability, technical capacity and psychological aptitude, security of the collection (the PCEs), and other complementary information.

The "CR" is granted to people over 18, remembering that for the acquisition of firearms, according to the current Brazilian legislation, it is necessary to be 25 years old. There are exceptions to the concession for minors, with specific processes before the Juvenile Court.

References

External links
  (Espaço CAC Brazilian Army - DFPC)
 Perguntas frequentes - Colecionador, Atirador Desportivo e Caçador CACs - FAQ

Society
Firearms
Gun politics
Brazilian legislation
Violence in Brazil
Firearm commerce
Firearm laws
Shooting sports
Hunting
Collecting